Armeniaca, a Latin word meaning from Armenia, may refer to :
 Legio I Armeniaca, a pseudocomitatensis legion of the Late Roman Empire probably created in the late 3rd century
 Legio II Armeniaca, a legion of the late Roman Empire

Species and genus names
 Armeniaca, a synonym of the genus Prunus, particularly Armeniaca vulgaris, a synonym for Prunus armeniaca, the apricot tree

Latin words and phrases